D. Luis de Almeida, Count of Avintes (d 22 December 1671), was a Portuguese nobleman and military man, Governor of Rio de Janeiro and, later (in 1661-1662) the last Portuguese Governor of Tangier.

See also 
 Marquesses of Lavradio

References 
The information in this article is based on that in its Portuguese equivalent.

1671 deaths
17th-century Portuguese people
Governors of Tangier